Neachandella is a genus of moth in the family Cosmopterigidae. It contains only one species, Neachandella desis, which is found in New Guinea.

References

External links
Natural History Museum Lepidoptera genus database

Cosmopterigidae